Uranotaenia (Uranotaenia) lateralis is a species of zoophilic mosquito belonging to the genus Uranotaenia. It is found in Thailand, Sri Lanka, Japan, Australia, China, Indonesia, Malaysia, New Guinea, Papua New Guinea, Philippines, Solomon Islands, Thailand, Timor, and Vietnam. They are known to live in crab holes. It prefer to live around banks of water pools and known to feed on mudskippers.

References

External links
Studies on the mosquitoes in the Yaeyama Islands, Japan. 4. Uranotaenia lateralis Ludlow 1905, new to Japan  [1979]
Blood meal identification and feeding habits of uranotaenia species collected in the ryukyu archipelago.
Mosquitoes and their potential predators in rice agroecosystems of the Mekong Delta, southern Vietnam.

lateralis
Insects described in 1905